The Trois Saumons East River(in French: Trois Saumons Est) river is a tributary of the east bank of the Trois Saumons River which flows to the south bank of the St. Lawrence River where it flows south-west of the village of Saint-Jean-Port-Joli and north-east of the village of L'Islet-sur-Mer.

The Trois Saumons Est river flows through the municipalities of Saint-Damase-de-L'Islet and Saint-Aubert, in the L'Islet Regional County Municipality, in the administrative region of Chaudière-Appalaches, in Quebec, in Canada.

Geography 
The Trois Saumons Est river has its source on the eastern slope of the mountain designated "Le Pain de Sucre" which overlooks the eastern part of Trois Saumons lake, located in the municipality of Saint-Aubert.

The Trois Saumons Est River flows onto the east bank of the Trois Saumons River, west of Route 204.

Toponymy 
The toponym Rivière Trois Saumons Est was formalized on December 5, 1968, at the Commission de toponymie du Québec.

See also 

 List of rivers of Quebec

References 

Rivers of Chaudière-Appalaches
L'Islet Regional County Municipality